Strugi may refer to the following villages in Poland:

Strugi, Łódź Voivodeship (central Poland)
Strugi, Masovian Voivodeship (east-central Poland)
Strugi, Otwock County in Masovian Voivodeship (east-central Poland)
Strugi, Greater Poland Voivodeship (west-central Poland)